This is a list of cricketers who have represented Peshawar Zalmi in Pakistan Super League. Players are listed alphabetically using the standard naming format of their country of origin followed by the year(s) that they have been active as a Peshawar player.

For the list of current players see the current squad.

A
 Aamer Yamin (2016)
 Abdur Rehman (2016)
 Jim Allenby (2016)
 Mohammad Arif (2018)
 Mohammad Asghar (2016–2018)

B
 Jonny Bairstow (2016)
 Dwayne Bravo (2018)

F
 Andre Fletcher (2018)

H
 Hammad Azam (2018)
 Haris Sohail (2017-2018)
 Hasan Ali (2016–2018)
 Brad Hodge (2016)

I
 Ibtisam Sheikh (2018)
 Iftikhar Ahmed (2017)
 Imran Khan (2016–2017)
 Irfan Khan (2017)

J
 Junaid Khan (2016–2017)
 Chris Jordan (2017-2018)

K
 Kamran Akmal (2016–2018)
 Khalid Usman (2018)
 Khushdil Shah (2017-2018)

L
 Evin Lewis (2018)

M
 Dawid Malan (2016–2017)
 Mohammad Hafeez (2016–2018)
 Eoin Morgan (2017)

S
 Saad Nasim (2018)
 Samit Patel (2017)
 Sameen Gul (2018)
 Darren Sammy (2016–2018)
 Marlon Samuels (2018)
 Shahid Afridi (2016–2017)
 Shahid Yousuf (2016)
 Shakib Al Hasan (2017-2018)
 Shaun Tait (2018)
 Sohaib Maqsood (2017)

T
 Taimur Sultan (2018)
 Tamim Iqbal (2016–2018)

W
 Wahab Riaz (2016–2018)

References

Peshawar Zalmi
Peshawar Zalmi